Maud Diver (born Katherine Helen Maud Marshall; 9 September 1867 – 14 October 1945) was an English author in British India who wrote novels, short stories, biographies and journalistic pieces primarily on Indian topics and Englishmen in India.

Personal life
Diver was born Katherine Helen Maud Marshall in Murree, now in Pakistan, where her father Charles Henry Tilson Marshall served as an officer in the British Indian Army. She grew up in India and Ceylon (now Sri Lanka), but received her education in England. She had a lifelong friendship with the sister of Rudyard Kipling, Trix Fleming. Diver married Thomas Diver (1860–1941), an officer in the Royal Warwickshire Regiment, . They settled in England and had a son, Cyril (1892–1962).

Writing
Maud Diver published her first novel, Captain Desmond, VC, in 1907. This and several subsequent books were successful and charted on the bestseller lists of the time. She specialised in the imperial romance genre which was popular at the time. However, unlike her contemporary, Kipling, Diver has been forgotten by later generations. There has been recent interest in her books as a source of information for studies on Anglo-Indian culture.

Her novels tried to instruct Englishmen on how they were to live in British India and included depictions of mixed marriages (for example in Lilamani and its sequels) between Indians and the English as a positive means of bringing East and West together. She countered Kipling's aphorism of "East is East and West is West, and never the twain shall meet" with,

At the same time, she also held the view that the British bloodline should not be diluted too much (as in the book, Desmond's Daughter).

Bibliography

References

 Descendants of Sir Frederick Pollock
"Diver, Maud"  The Oxford Companion to Edwardian Fiction. Sandra Kemp, Charlotte Mitchell and David Trotter. Oxford University Press 2002. Oxford Reference Online. Oxford University Press.
 Who Was Who (A&C Black, January 2007, KnowUK)

External links

 
 

1867 births
1945 deaths
British women short story writers
English women journalists
English women novelists
English writers
Women biographers
British people in colonial India
English women non-fiction writers